The 2006 Mississauga municipal elections took place on November 13, 2006, to elect a mayor and 11 city councillors in Mississauga, Ontario, Canada. The 2006 election was noteworthy for its record number of candidates, in part due to two new wards being added to Council. Details about the candidates in the 2006 election and past elections in Mississauga are listed as an external link below. In addition, school trustees were elected to the Peel District School Board, Dufferin-Peel Catholic District School Board, Conseil scolaire de district du Centre-Sud-Ouest and Conseil scolaire de district catholique Centre-Sud.  These elections were held in conjunction with those held in all other municipalities across the province of Ontario (see 2006 Ontario municipal elections).

Mayoral race

City council

External links
Official City of Mississauga Vote 2006 website
Details about candidates, 2006 election and past elections in Mississauga

2006 Ontario municipal elections
Municipal government of Mississauga